L'Amour monstre ("monstrous love") is a 1954 novel by the French writer Louis Pauwels. It is set in the 16th century and tells the story of a possibly bewitched love affair between a doctor and a young woman sent to a monastery.

The novel was the runner-up for the 1955 Prix Goncourt. Ingmar Bergman was at one point attached to direct a film adaptation, but the project was not realised.

The book is mentioned in the lyrics of Serge Gainsbourg's 1968 song "Initials B.B." Gainsbourg had been recommended the book by Brigitte Bardot.

References

1954 French novels
Éditions du Seuil books
French-language novels
Novels set in the 16th century
Works by Louis Pauwels